Lieutenant admiral Hugo van den Wall Bake (18 March 1913 – 22 January 1981) was a Dutch military officer who served as Chairman of the United Defence Staff of the Armed Forces of the Netherlands between 1969 and 1972.

References

External links 
 

1913 births
1981 deaths
Royal Netherlands Navy admirals
Royal Netherlands Navy officers
Chiefs of the Defence Staff (Netherlands)